Derek Percival Scales (3 July 1921 – 28 August 2004) was an Australian literary scholar and former Professor of French and Dean of Faculty of Arts at the Australian National University. He was known for his works on Aldous Huxley and Alphonse Karr.

Books
 Alphonse Karr: sa vie et son oeuvre (1808-1890), Derek P. Scales, Droz 1959
 Aldous Huxley and French literature, Derek P. Scales, Sydney University Press 1969

References

2004 deaths
1921 births
Academic staff of the Australian National University
University of Sydney alumni
University of Paris alumni
Australian literary critics
Place of birth missing
Australian expatriates in France